The Gabbs Valley Range is a mountain range in the west of the central Nevada desert in the Great Basin region. The range is within Mineral County, Nevada.

The valley was named after an engineer, E. S. Gabbs.

Gabbs Watershed
The  Gabbs Watershed (USGS Huc 16060002) is a  area that includes the  Gabbs Valley and the slopes of the perimeter Great Basin mountain ranges within the watersheds' drainage divides, e.g., of the Gabbs Valley Range.

References 

Mountain ranges of Nevada
Mountain ranges of the Great Basin
Mountain ranges of Mineral County, Nevada